A Slice of Life may refer to:

 Slice of life, a genre of art depicting mundane experiences
 A Slice of Life (1914 film), an American silent film
 A Slice of Life (1954 film), an Italian-French film
 A Slice of Life (1983 film), an Australian comedy film
 "A Slice of Life" (short story), by P. G. Wodehouse
 "Slice of Life" (My Little Pony: Friendship Is Magic), a television episode
 "The Slice of Life", an episode of Roseanne